Tropical cyclones are named for historical reasons and so as to avoid confusion when communicating with the public, as more than one tropical cyclone can exist at a time. Names are drawn in order from predetermined lists. They are usually assigned to tropical cyclones with one-, three- or ten-minute windspeeds of at least 65 km/h (40 mph). However, standards vary from basin to basin, with some tropical depressions named in the Western Pacific whilst tropical cyclones have to have gale-force winds occurring more than halfway around the center within the Australian and Southern Pacific regions.

The official practice of naming tropical cyclones started in 1945 within the Western Pacific. Naming continued through the next few years, and in 1950, names also started to be assigned to tropical storms forming in the North Atlantic Ocean. In the Atlantic, names were originally taken from the World War Two version of the Phonetic Alphabet, but this was changed in 1953 to use lists of women's names which were created yearly. Around this time naming of tropical cyclones also began within the southern and central parts of the Pacific. However naming did not begin in the Eastern Pacific until 1960, with the original naming lists designed to be used year after year in sequence. In 1960, naming also began in the Southwest Indian Ocean, and in 1963 the Philippine Meteorological Service started assigning names to tropical cyclones that moved into or formed in their area of responsibility. Later in 1963 warning centers within the Australian region also commenced naming tropical cyclones. In 2011, the Brazilian Navy Hydrographic Center started using naming list to name tropical cyclones over the South Atlantic basin.

North Atlantic
By 1950, tropical cyclones that were judged by the US Weather Bureau to have intensified into a tropical storm started to be assigned names. Storms were originally named in alphabetical order using the World War Two version of the Phonetic Alphabet. By 1952 a new phonetic alphabet had been developed and this led to confusion as some parties wanted to use the newer phonetic alphabet.  In 1953, to alleviate any confusion, forecasters decided to use a set of 23 feminine names. After the 1953 Atlantic hurricane season, public reception to the idea seemed favorable, so the same list was adopted for the next year with one change: Gilda for Gail. However, after storms like Carol and Hazel got a lot of publicity during the 1953 season, forecasters agreed to develop a new set of names for 1955. However, before this could happen, a tropical storm was declared significant on January 2, 1955, and was named as Alice. The new set of names were developed and used in 1955 beginning with Brenda continuing through the alphabet to Zelda. For each season before 1960, a new set of names was developed. In 1960 forecasters decided to begin rotating names in a regular sequence and thus four alphabetical lists were established to be repeated every four years. The sets followed the example of the western Pacific typhoon naming lists and excluded names beginning with the letters Q, U, X, Y and Z. These four lists were used until 1972 when the National Oceanic and Atmospheric Administration (NOAA) replaced them with 9 lists designed to be used from 1972. In 1977, NOAA made the decision to relinquish control over the name selection by allowing a regional committee of the World Meteorological Organization to select the new sets of names, which would contain male names and some Spanish and French names, in order to reflect all the cultures and languages within the Atlantic Ocean. The World Meteorological Organization decided that the new lists of hurricane name would start to be used in 1979. Since 1979 the same lists have been used, but with names of significant tropical cyclones removed from the lists and replaced with new names. In 2002 subtropical cyclones started to be assigned names from the main list of names set up for that year. In 2005 and 2020, as all the names pre-selected for the season were exhausted, the contingency plan of using Greek letters for names had to be used. Following Hurricane Eta and Hurricane Iota, the WMO decided that to retire a Greek-letter storm, the letter would be used again, but the name, with the year after it, would be included in a list of retired names: Eta (2020) and Iota (2020). When this plan was generally rejected, it was decided to discontinue the use of Greek letters and to instead replace them with an auxiliary name list, which has not yet been used.

Names used between 1950 and 1964

Names used between 1965 and 1979

Names used between 1980 and 1994

Names used between 1995 and 2008

Names used between 2009 and 2022

Eastern North Pacific
Within the Eastern Pacific basin between the western coasts of the Americas and 140°W the naming of tropical cyclones started in 1960, with four lists of female names initially designed to be used consecutively before being repeated. In 1965 after two lists of names had been used, it was decided to return to the top of the second list and start recycling the sets of names on an annual basis. In 1977, after protests by various women's rights groups, NOAA made the decision to relinquish control over the name selection by allowing a regional committee of the World Meteorological Organization (WMO) to select new sets of names. The WMO selected six lists of names which contained male names and rotated every six years. They also decided that the new lists of hurricane name would start to be used in 1978 which was a year earlier than the Atlantic. Since 1978 the same lists of names have been used, with names of significant tropical cyclones removed from the lists and replaced with new names. As in the Atlantic basin should the names preselected for the season be exhausted, the contingency plan of using Greek letters for names would be used.  However unlike in the Atlantic basin the contingency plan has never had to be used, although in 1985 to avoid using the contingency plan, the letters X, Y, and Z were added to the lists. Since the contingency plan had to be used in the North Atlantic during 2005 there have been a few attempts to get rid of the Greek names as they are seen to be inconsistent with the standard naming convention used for tropical cyclones and are generally unknown and confusing to the public. In wake of the 2020 Atlantic hurricane season with Hurricane Iota and Hurricane Eta the World Meteorological Organization decided to stop using the Greek letter naming system  in the Eastern Pacific as well despite never being used in the basin, it was replaced with a new supplemental naming system different from the Atlantic's list.

Names used between 1960 and 1974

Names used between 1975 and 1989

Names used between 1990 and 1999

Names used between 2000 and 2009

Names used between 2010 and 2022

Central North Pacific (Date Line to 140°W)
In 1950 a tropical cyclone that affected Hawaii was named Able, after a tropical cyclone had not affected Hawaii for a number of years. The system was also named Salome by the Air Weather Service Office in Guam, before it became widely known as Hurricane Hiki. Typhoon Olive of 1952 developed within the Central Pacific, but was not named until it had crossed the International Dateline and moved into the Western Pacific basin. During 1957, three other tropical cyclones developed in the Central Pacific and were named Kanoa, Della and Nina, by the Hawaiian military meteorological offices. It was subsequently decided that future tropical cyclones, would be named by borrowing names from the Western Pacific naming lists. Hawaiian names were reinstated for the lists during 1979, with 5 sets of names drafted using only the 12 letters of the Hawaiian alphabet, with the intent being to use the sets of names on an annual rotation basis. However, after no storms had developed in this region between 1979 and 1981, the annual lists were scrapped and replaced with four sets of names and designed to be used consecutively. Ahead of the 2007 hurricane season, the Central Pacific Hurricane Center (CPHC) introduced a revised set of Hawaiian names for the Central Pacific, after they had worked with the University of Hawaii Hawaiian Studies Department to ensure the correct meaning and appropriate historical and cultural use of the names.

Western North Pacific
In the Western North Pacific Ocean, there are two sets of names generally used. The first are the international names assigned to a tropical cyclone by the Japan Meteorological Agency (JMA) or the Joint Typhoon Warning Center (JTWC). The second set of names are local names assigned to a tropical cyclone by the Philippine Atmospheric, Geophysical and Astronomical Services Administration. This system often ends up with a tropical cyclone being assigned two names, should a tropical storm threaten the Philippines.

On January 1, 2000, the Japan Meteorological Agency, as the official Regional Specialized Meteorological Center, took over the naming of tropical cyclones in this basin. The names selected by the World Meteorological Organization's Typhoon Committee were from a pool of names submitted by the various countries that make up the Typhoon Committee.

Names used between 1945 and 1959

Names used between 1960 and 1974

Names used between 1975 and 1989

Names used between 1990 and 2004

Names used between 2005 and 2014

Names used between 2015 and 2022

Philippines
Since 1963, the Philippine Atmospheric, Geophysical and Astronomical Services Administration (PAGASA), have assigned their own names to typhoons that pass through its area of responsibility. Unlike the World Meteorological Organization's standard of assigning names to tropical cyclones when they reach wind-speeds of 65 km/h (40 mph), PAGASA assigns a name to a tropical depression when they either form or move into their area of responsibility. Four sets of tropical cyclone names are rotated annually with typhoon names stricken from the list should they do more than  pesos worth of damage to the Philippines and/or cause 300 or more deaths. Should the list of names for a given year prove insufficient, names are taken from an auxiliary list.

Names used between 1963 and 1974

Names used between 1975 and 1987

Names used between 1988 and 2000

Names used between 2001 and 2014

Names used between 2015 and 2022

North Indian Ocean
During its annual session in 2000 the WMO/ESCAP Panel on North Indian tropical cyclones, agreed in principle to start assigning names to Cyclonic Storms that developed within the North Indian Ocean. As a result, the panel requested that each member country submit a list of ten names to a rapporteur by the end of the year 2000. At the 2001 session of the Panel, the rapporteur reported that seven of the eight countries had submitted their names. However, India had refused to submit a list of names, as it had some reservations about assigning names to tropical cyclones, due to the regional, cultural and linguistic diversity of the panel members. The panel subsequently studied the names and felt that some of the names would not be appealing to the public or the media, and requested that members submit new lists of names. At the following years session the rapporteur reported that there had been a poor response by member countries in resubmitting their lists of names. In response the panel felt that it was important that the work continued and urged the members to copperate and submit their names to the rapporteur. The names were subsequently submitted in time for the 2004 session, however, India had still not submitted their names, despite promising to do so. The rapporteur presented the 4 lists of names that would be used with a gap left for India's names and recommended that the India Meteorological Department's Regional Specialised Meteorological Centre in New Delhi name the systems. The rapporteur also recommended that the naming lists were used on an experimental basis during the season, starting in May or June 2004 and that the lists should only be used until 2009 when a new list would be drawn up for the following ten years. The naming lists were then completed in May 2004, after India submitted their names, however the lists were not used until September 2004 when the first tropical cyclone was named Onil by India Meteorological Department. However, in May 2020, the naming of Cyclone Amphan exhausted the original list of names established in 2004. Therefore, a new list of names has been prepared and will be used in alphabetical order for storms after Amphan, and began with Nisarga in the same year.

Names used between 2004 to 2018

Names used between 2019 to 2022

South-West Indian Ocean
In January 1960, a formal naming scheme was introduced for the South-West Indian Ocean between Africa and 80°E, by the Mauritius and Madagascan Weather Services with the first cyclone being named Alix. Over the next few years the names were selected in various ways including by the meteorological services of the region for several years at a time, before it was turned over to the WMO's South West Indian Ocean Tropical Cyclone Committee at the start of the 2000–01 season.

Names used between January 1960 and July 1975

Names used between August 1974 and July 1989

Names used between August 1989 and June 2004

Names used between July 2004 and June 2016

Names used between July 2016 and February 2023

Australian Region
Ahead of the 1963-64 season, the Australian Bureau of Meteorology announced that a national scheme to name tropical cyclones had been introduced. Each of the Tropical Cyclone Warning Centers (TCWCs) in Perth, Darwin and Brisbane were allocated a separate list of fourteen female names, that started with every third letter, while the letters Q, X, Y and Z were not used. The names were designed to be used in public bulletins, allocated in alphabetical order by the warning centre concerned and on the first indication that a tropical cyclone had developed within their individual area of responsibility. It was also decided that should a tropical cyclone would retain its original name, should it move into another TCWC's area of responsibility. The first name was assigned to Tropical Cyclone Bessie by TCWC Perth on January 6, 1964, before TCWC Brisbane named Tropical Cyclone Audrey later that month. Over the next two years, these naming lists were used by the individual warning centres, before a fresh list of 90 female names was introduced ahead of the 1965-66. Female names were used exclusively until the current convention of alternating male and female names commenced in 1975. Naming lists were introduced for the Papuan National Weather Service and Indonesian Badan Meteorologi, Klimatologi, dan Geofisika. In 2008, the lists used by the three TCWC centres were combined to form a single list of names. Names that cause significant damage within the Australian region are retired with new names selected at the bi-annual meeting of the World Meteorological Organization's RA V Tropical Cyclone Committee.

Names used between July 1963 and June 1973

Names used between July 1973 and June 1983

Names used between July 1983 and June 1993

Names used between July 1993 and June 2003

Names used between July 2003 and June 2013

Names used between July 2013 and February 2023

South Pacific
Tropical Cyclones started to be named within the South Pacific, by the New Caledonia Meteorological Office during the 1958–59 season. The Fiji Office of the New Zealand Meteorological Service subsequently started to also name cyclones during the 1969–70 season with Alice being the first name to be used.

Names used between 1958 and 1970

Names used between July 1970 and June 1985

Names used between July 1985 and June 2000

Names used between July 2000 and June 2014

Names used between July 2015 and March 2023

South Atlantic
As the system was threatening the Brazilian state of Santa Catarina, a newspaper used the headline "Furacão Catarina," which was presumed to mean "furacão (hurricane) threatening (Santa) Catarina (the state)". However, when the international press started monitoring the system, it was assumed that "Furacão Catarina" meant "Hurricane Catarina" and that it had been formally named in the usual way. During March 12, 2010, Brazilian public and private weather services decided to name a tropical storm: Anita in order to avoid confusion in future references. A naming list was subsequently set up by the Brazilian Navy Hydrographic Center with various names taken from that list between 2011 and the present day.

See also

List of named storms
Tropical cyclone naming
European windstorm names
Atlantic hurricane season
List of Pacific hurricane seasons
South Atlantic tropical cyclone
Tropical cyclone

Notes

References

External links
AskBOM: How do tropical cyclones get their names?
US National Hurricane Center
Central Pacific Hurricane Center 
Japan Meteorological Agency
India Meteorological Department
Météo-France –La Reunion
Fiji Meteorological Service
Indonesian Meteorological Department
Australian Bureau of Meteorology .
Meteorological Service of New Zealand Limited

Names historical tropical cyclone
Tropical cyclone naming